RSQ was a Slovene music magazine published monthly from 13 May 2007 through 13 December 2009.

Overview
At first RSQ was only a digital/internet magazine that tried to fill the gap in Slovenian music magazines.
Its first issue was published on 13 May 2007. It came out regularly every 13th of the month for a good year and a half. On 22 May 2008 RSQ was printed for the first time in honour of its first year of existence.

Slovene group Sphericube released its first album, Jugda, with the issue. Two concerts under the name RSQlive were made due to the release. The public in Ljubljana (Gala Hala) and Maribor (Jazz klub Satchmo) was able to see Sphericube and the first two concerts by Adam (a group made by members of Srečna mladina, Gušti & Polona and Anavrin). The issue included a list of the "50 Best Albums in Independent Slovenia". 13 January 2009 the magazine started to publish monthly printed magazine. It was made by a group of young journalists, photographers and media people who tried to cover Slovenian and foreign music scene. In February 2009 they published The Days That Follow ..., the third album by a group Multiball. In March, Against the Gravity by Elvis Jackson, in April the debut album by Corkscrew, in June debut album by BRO and in November album Muzej revolucije by Zabranjeno Pusenje. The last issue of RSQ was published on 13 December 2009.

RSQ also helped promoting the first Slovenian internet concert by a group Kamerad Krivatoff.

The magazine featured interviews, CD and concert reviews, musician portraits, discographies.

See also
 List of magazines in Slovenia

References

2007 establishments in Slovenia
2009 disestablishments in Slovenia
Music magazines
Slovene-language magazines
Magazines established in 2007
Magazines disestablished in 2009
Defunct magazines published in Slovenia
Slovenian music websites
Monthly magazines